In the Indian context, the term pseudo-secularism is used as a pejorative to describe policies considered to involve minority appeasement. The Hindus form the majority religious community in India; the term "pseudo-secular" implies that those who claim to be secular are actually not so, but are anti-Hindu or pro-minority. The Hindu nationalist politicians accused of being "communal" use it as a counter-accusation against their critics claiming that the Secularism followed by Congress is faulty or "perverted".

Background 

The first recorded use of the term "pseudo-secularism" was in the 1951 book Philosophy and Action of the R.S.S. for the Hind Swaraj, by Anthony Elenjimittam. In his book Elenjimittam accused leaders of the Indian National Congress of pretending to uphold secularism.

After the Bharatiya Janata Party (BJP) was accused of representing the Hindu communalism in Indian politics it started using the counter-charge of "pseudo-secularism" against the Congress and other parties. The BJP leader LK Advani characterises pseudo-secular politicians as those for whom "secularism is only a euphemism for vote-bank politics". According to him, these politicians are not concerned with the welfare of the minorities, but only interested in their vote.

The Congress leader Mani Shankar Aiyar has criticized the term as propaganda by Hindu nationalists. Historian Mridula Mukherjee has described it as "a term propounded by the ideologues of Hindu nationalism to delegitimize and deny the genuineness of secularism. The subtext is that secularism is only a veneer put on to hide alleged policies of minority appeasement. The proponents of the term allege the secularists of being pro-Muslim and anti-Hindu."

Examples

The state policies of independent India accorded special rights to Muslims, along with other religious minorities like Christians and Parsis, in matters of personal law. For example,

 In 1986, a Muslim woman Shah Bano Begum was denied alimony even after winning a court case, because the Indian Parliament reversed the court judgement under pressure of Islamic orthodoxy. This is often presented as proof of the Congress's practice of pseudo-secularism by many Indians.
 Special laws for Muslims, such as those allowing triple talaq (now banned) and polygamy, are also considered as pseudo-secular and supporters of this demand an equal legal code for all communities including Muslims called Uniform Civil Code
 The religion-based reservations in civil and educational institutions are also seen as evidence of pseudo-secularism and are criticized to undermine merit.
 In 1998, the Rashtriya Swayamsevak Sangh accused BJP of playing along with pseudo-secular parties for compromising on issues like Article 370, Ram temple and Uniform civil code of India.
 In 2006, Manmohan Singh, then Prime Minister of India said that "We will have to devise innovative plans to ensure that minorities, particularly the Muslim minority, are empowered to share equitably in the fruits of development. These must have the first claim on resources." during his speech at the 52nd meeting of the National Development Council. According to the critics, this later part of the statement goes against the idea of secularism which might state that each and every citizen of this nation must have an equal share in the resources of this country. BJP and RSS accused the Prime Minister of 'Muslim Appeasement".
 Hindu Temples are managed by state government. Religious places of minority religions like Islam, Christianity and Sikhism are managed by their followers. This is considered as an example of pseudo secularism.

See also

 Secularism in India
 Communalism (South Asia)
 Dominant minority
 Minoritarianism
 Reverse discrimination
 Victim card
 Islamo-leftism
 Counter-jihad
 Paradox of tolerance
 Reservation in India

Further reading
Shourie, Arun (1998). Indian controversies: Essays on religion in politics. New Delhi: HarperCollins. 
Shourie, Arun (2005). A secular agenda: For saving our country, for welding it. New Delhi, India: Rupa. 
Goel, Sita Ram (1995). Perversion of India's political parlance. 
Goel, S. R. (2003). India's secularism, new name for national subversion. New Delhi: Voice of India.  (Original in Hindi: Sekyūlarijma, rāshṭradroha kā dusarā nāma; translation into English by Yashpal Sharma.)

References

External links
 Hasan Suroor (30 April 2014) Sins in the name of secularism - The Hindu
 Dr S.K. Srivastava (16 Dec 2014) Skewed secularism? - IBN Live

Identity politics in India
Secularism in India